Shilajit ("Conqueror of mountains, Conqueror of the Rocks, Destroyer of Weakness") or Mumijo   is a blackish-brown powder or an exudate from high mountain rocks, often found in the Himalayas, Badakhshan- Afghanistan, Karakoram, Gilgit-Baltistan - Pakistan, Nepal, Bhutan, Russia, Central Asia, Iran, Mongolia and in the south of Peru, where it is called Andean Shilajit. Also known as μούμια (in Greek), Mumiyo (in Russian), Brag-shun or Barakhshin (means "oil of the mountains" in South Siberian region of the Sayano-Altai Mountains, Khakassia,  Buryatia, Mongolia), Rock sap or Rock juice (in Tibet, Central Asia, Himalaya, Pamir and Altai), Marathi or Gujarati (in Hindi), شلاجیت ( in Urdu ) Asphalt (in English), Silajita, Silajatu (in Bengali),  Hajarul-Musa or Araq-al-jibal (in Arabic), Myemu, Moomiaii or Mumnaei (in Persian), Mumie (in German), Mineral Pitch, Jew’s Pitch, Mineral Wax, Kao-tun (blood of the mountain in Birma),  Tasmay and Slag (China), "Blessing of Nature" (Nepal).

Composition 
Although shilajit is sometimes referred to as a mineral tar or resin, it is not actually either of those. It is a highly viscous substance like a tar or resin that is very dark brown or black in color, but unlike these is readily soluble in water but insoluble in ethanol.

Shilajit is composed of 60% to 80% humic substances such as humic and fulvic acids.  The mineral content is 15–20%, along with trace elements including selenium. Therefore, Shilajit is rich in nutrients such as mineral salts, amino acids,  etc., and other organic components including: benzoic acid, hippuric acid, fatty acids (myristic acid, stearic acid, Oleic acid, petroselinic acid, linoleic acid, lauric acid, saturated fatty acids), ichthyridine, salicylic acid, resins, triterpenes, sterols, aromatic carboxylic acids, 3,4-benzocoumarins, amino groups acids, phenolic lipids, 85 trace minerals (potassium, calcium, and magnesium are the most prevalent), latex, albumin, sterols, tea polyphenols, phenolic lipids, dibenzo-alpha-pyrones (DBP), selenium, and dibenzo-α-pyrone chromoproteins (DCPs).

Mumiyo varieties 
The composition of mumiyo varies by location and appearance:

Coprolitic (mumiyo-saladji, Pamir and Altai mumiyo, mumiyo-asil, etc.) are fossilized phyto- and zooorganic remains mixed with fragments and gruss of rocks and soil formations. The content of extractive substances in coprolite mumiyo ranges from 10 to 30% or more.

Mumiyo-bearing breccias are large-clastic rocks (more often, fissured limestones) cemented by mumiyo-bearing clay mass. The content of extractive substances is from 0.5 to 5.0%.

Evaporite mumiyo occurs in formations of streaks, icicles and shiny black or gray dull, thin films that stain the roofs and walls of caves, niches, grottoes and other large cavities. Its extraction is difficult.

Some researchers hypothesize that shilajit is produced by the decomposition or humification of latex and resin-bearing plant material from species such as Euphorbia royleana and Trifolium repens over a period of centuries.

Mumioids are a group of natural formations resembling mumiyo in appearance. The group includes ozokerite, saltpeter, fossilized vegetable resins and gums, mountain wax, white, stone and mountain oils, Antarctic shilajit, lofor, or aqua bitum.

Classification 
Shilajit occurs in different colors and grades according to the type of metal contained: red (Sauvarna Shilajit) with gold, white (Rajat Shilajit) with silver, blue (Tamra, with copper Shilajit) and iron-containing black (Lauha Shilajit Shilajit). Of these, black shilajit containing gold is the rarest and is considered to have the best curative effect. In nature, shilajit containing iron is used most in traditional medicine.

Mumiyo has been used used as a folk medicine and in alternative medicine for more than 4000 years. Mumiyo has been used for medicinal purposes since antiquity in Central Asia, Iran, Afghanistan, India, Tibet, China, etc. The healing effects of Mumiyo for different diseases is mentioned in the works of Aristotle, Razi, Biruni, Ibn Sina and others.

Research 
In 1955 Shakirov, based on ethnography study and old medical manuscripts, started systematic pharmacological study of Mumiye-asil.

In 1976  Mumiye-asil was found beneficial in the complex treatment of bone fractures.

In 1978, on the initiative of the Ministry of Health of the Uzbek SSR, the 3rd All-Union Symposium was held in Tashkent on experimental and morphological studies of the effect of mumiyo on the regeneration of nerves, heart muscle and bones.

References

Ayurvedic medicaments
Sowa Rigpa medicaments